is a Japanese politician and current mayor of Yokohama, the capital of Kanagawa Prefecture. He defeated incumbent mayor Fumiko Hayashi in the 2021 Yokohama mayoral election. His independent campaign was supported by the Constitutional Democratic Party, Social Democratic Party, and the Communist Party of Japan. Yamanaka's campaign focused on the opposition for a planned integrated resort development and casino for the city which was to be built on Yamashita Pier, criticism against the government's response to the COVID-19 pandemic, and additional sister city relationship with San Francisco, California.

Yamanaka formerly worked as a professor at Yokohama City University and as a data scientist.

References

Living people
1972 births
21st-century Japanese politicians
Mayors of Yokohama
Mayors of places in Kanagawa Prefecture
Waseda University alumni
Academic staff of Yokohama City University
Data scientists
Politicians from Saitama Prefecture